Sandnesposten (The Sandnes Gazette) is a local Norwegian newspaper published in Sandnes in Rogaland county. 

The newspaper was launched in 1990 and is published twice a week, on Tuesdays and Thursdays. It is owned by Nordsjø Media and has eight employees. The editor of the paper has been Frode Myhra Gjerald since January 2014; previously, Gjerald worked as the editor of the newspaper Hordaland in Voss.

Circulation
According to the Norwegian Audit Bureau of Circulations and National Association of Local Newspapers, Sandnesposten has had the following annual circulation:
 2006: 3,642
 2007: 3,971
 2008: 4,222
 2009: 4,159
 2010: 4,192
 2011: 4,022
 2012: 4,018
 2013: 3,995
 2014: 3,999
 2015: 4,650
 2016: 4,566

References

External links
Sandnesposten homepage

Newspapers published in Norway
Norwegian-language newspapers
Sandnes
Mass media in Rogaland
Publications established in 1990
1990 establishments in Norway